Kirsana is a town in northwestern Syria. Kirsana is administratively part of the Latakia Governorate, located north of Latakia. Nearby localities include Al-Shamiyah and Burj Islam to the north, Burj al-Qasab to the southwest and Sitmarkho to the south. According to the Syria Central Bureau of Statistics, Kirsana had a population of 5,499 in the 2004 census. Its inhabitants are predominantly Alawites.

References

Populated places in Latakia District
Alawite communities in Syria